The Return of Clint the Stranger (aka There's a Noose Waiting for You Trinity!) is a 1972 Italian-Spanish Western film directed by Alfonso Balcázar and starring Klaus Kinski. The film is a sequel to Clint the Stranger.

Plot
Trinity is a former gunslinger desperate to be forgiven by his family that he abandoned years ago. A ruthless bounty hunter tracks down Trinity and forces him to return to his criminal ways to protect himself and his family.

Cast
 George Martin as Clint Murrayson
 Marina Malfatti as Norma Murrayson
 Klaus Kinski as Scott
 Daniel Martín as Slim
 Augusto Pescarini as Jimmy Murrayson
 Francisco José Huetos as Mr Scranton
 Susanna Atkinson as Betty Murrayson (as Billy)
 Willi Colombini as (as Willy Colombini)
 Luis Ponciado as Brandon
 Gaspar 'Indio' González as Sheriff Culver (as Indio González)
 Manuel Muñiz as Telegrapher (as Pajarito)
 Manuel Sas as Bill McKinley
 Manuel Bronchud as Slim's Right Hand
 Ricardo Moyán
 Gustavo Re as Blinky
 Adolfo Alises as Mr. Thompson
 Miguel Muniesa as Ben
 Vittorio Fanfoni as Murdoch brother
 Luigi Antonio Guerra as Murdoch brother

References

External links

1972 films
1972 Western (genre) films
1970s Spanish-language films
Spanish Western (genre) films
Spaghetti Western films
Films directed by Alfonso Balcázar
1970s Italian films